Chi Lăng is a township of Tịnh Biên District in An Giang Province, Vietnam.

References

Communes of An Giang province
Populated places in An Giang province
Townships in Vietnam